The sturgeon poacher (Podothecus accipenserinus), also known as the sturgeon-like sea-poacher in Canada, is a fish in the family Agonidae. It was described by Wilhelm Gottlieb Tilesius von Tilenau in 1813. It is a marine, temperate water-dwelling fish which is known from the northern Pacific Ocean, including the western Bering Sea, Cape Navarin, the Commander Islands, the Sea of Okhotsk, the Aleutian Islands, and northern California, USA.

The Sturgeon poacher's diet consists of bony fish, crustaceans such as amphipods, copepods and shrimp, and annelid worms.

References

Sturgeon poacher
Fish described in 1813
Taxa named by Wilhelm Gottlieb Tilesius von Tilenau